The 1998 Girabola was the 20th season of top-tier football competition in Angola. The season began on April 1, 1998. Primeiro de Agosto were the defending champions.

The league comprised 16 teams, the bottom three of which were relegated to the 1999 Gira Angola.

Primeiro de Agosto were crowned champions, winning their 7th title, while Chicoil, Kabuscorp and SECIL Marítima were relegated.

Alberto Ferreira aka Betinho of Petro de Luanda finished as the top scorer with 14 goals.

Changes from the 1997 season
Relegated: Benfica do Huambo, Primeiro de Maio
Promoted: Chicoil, SECIL

League table
<onlyinclude>{{#invoke:Sports table|main|style=WDL
|source=Girabola.com 

|team1=PRI |team2=PET |team3=RAN |team4=ASA |team5=SAG |team6=PRO |team7=SON |team8=ONZ |team9=IND |team10=ACA |team11=PHU |team12=FCC |team13=SCC |team14=SEC |team15=CHI |team16=KAB

|result1=CCL |result2= |result3=CCC |result14=REL |result15=REL |result16=DIS

|update=22 November 1999
|win_ACA=9 |draw_ACA=9 |loss_ACA=10 |gf_ACA=31 |ga_ACA=29 
|win_ASA=11 |draw_ASA=7 |loss_ASA=10 |gf_ASA=34 |ga_ASA=22 
|win_CHI=6 |draw_CHI=5 |loss_CHI=17 |gf_CHI=28 |ga_CHI=53 
|win_FCC=8 |draw_FCC=11 |loss_FCC=9 |gf_FCC=28 |ga_FCC=35 
|win_IND=10 |draw_IND=6 |loss_IND=12 |gf_IND=36 |ga_IND=51 
|win_KAB=0 |draw_KAB=0 |loss_KAB=0 |gf_KAB=0 |ga_KAB=0 
|win_ONZ=10 |draw_ONZ=7 |loss_ONZ=11 |gf_ONZ=36 |ga_ONZ=43 
|win_PET=15 |draw_PET=8 |loss_PET=5 |gf_PET=51 |ga_PET=18 
|win_PHU=8 |draw_PHU=11 |loss_PHU=9 |gf_PHU=35 |ga_PHU=35 
|win_PRI=18 |draw_PRI=6 |loss_PRI=4 |gf_PRI=37 |ga_PRI=14 
|win_PRO=11 |draw_PRO=7 |loss_PRO=10 |gf_PRO=26 |ga_PRO=30 
|win_RAN=11 |draw_RAN=10 |loss_RAN=7 |gf_RAN=45 |ga_RAN=27 
|win_SAG=11 |draw_SAG=7 |loss_SAG=10 |gf_SAG=33 |ga_SAG=33 
|win_SEC=5 |draw_SEC=9 |loss_SEC=14 |gf_SEC=26 |ga_SEC=41 
|win_SON=11 |draw_SON=6 |loss_SON=11 |gf_SON=27 |ga_SON=32 
|win_SCC=9 |draw_SCC=7 |loss_SCC=12 |gf_SCC=37 |ga_SCC=38 

|name_ACA=Académica do Lobito
|name_ASA=ASA
|name_CHI=Chicoil
|name_FCC=FC de Cabinda
|name_IND=Independente do Tômbwa
|name_KAB=Kabuscorp
|name_ONZ=Onze Bravos
|name_PET=Petro de Luanda
|name_PHU=Petro do Huambo
|name_PRI=Primeiro de Agosto
|name_PRO=Progresso do Sambizanga
|name_RAN=Rangol
|name_SAG=Sagrada Esperança
|name_SEC=Secil Marítima
|name_SON=Sonangol do Namibe
|name_SCC=Sporting de Cabinda

|status_PRI=C
|status_CHI=R
|status_SEC=R
|status_KAB=D
|status_text_D=Disqualified
|status_text_Q=Qualified to the phase indicated
|status_text_R=Relegated

|show_limit=5
|class_rules = 1) Points; 2) Head-to-head points; 3) Head-to-head goal difference; 4) Goal difference; 5) Goals scored; 6) Fair-play points; 7) Play-off.

|note_ONZ=Name later changed to Bravos do Maquis

|note_RAN=Name later changed to Benfica de Luanda

|note_SON=Name later changed to Atlético do Namibe

|note_KAB=Kabuscorp were disqualified after forfeiting their matches in rounds 28, 29 and 30. Forfeiting three matches resulted in all their games being annulled and the team subsequently disqualified, in spite of appeals. Also on account of that, ASA finished 3rd and Saneamento Rangol, 4th'.</small>
|note_ASA=KAB

|res_col_header=QR
|col_CCL=green1 |text_CCL=
|col_CCC=blue1  |text_CCC=
|col_REL=red1   |text_REL=Relegation to 
|col_DIS=red2   |text_DIS=Disqualified
}}</onlyinclude>

Results

Season statistics
Top scorer
 Alberto Ferreira Betinho''

Champions

References

External links
Girabola 1998 standings at girabola.com
Federação Angolana de Futebol

Girabola seasons
1998 in Angolan football
Angola